Casual Viewin' USA is a 2001 album by Canadian rock group, 54-40.

The album was compiled by the band's American distributor, Nettwerk, as a compilation of tracks from several of the band's previous albums, including its 2000 titlemate, "Casual Viewin'".

Track listing
 "Casual Viewin'"  – 4:44
 "Since When"  – 4:19
 "I Go Blind (Rerecorded)"  – 2:56
 "Blue Sky"  – 4:02
 "Lies to Me"  – 3:19
 "Baby Ran"  – 4:24
 "One Gun (Rerecorded)"  – 4:14
 "Ocean Pearl (Rerecorded)"  – 3:46
 "Love You All"  – 4:59
 "Nice to Luv You"  – 4:22
 "She's a Jones"  – 4:25
 "Sunday Girl"  – 4:41
 "Lost & Lazy"  – 4:23

Album Personnel

54-40

Additional personnel

Production
 Howard Redekopp - engineer

References

54-40 compilation albums
2001 compilation albums